Euseius prolixus is a species of mite in the family Phytoseiidae.

References

prolixus
Articles created by Qbugbot
Animals described in 1968